Blues in Trinity is an album by Jamaican-born England-based jazz trumpeter Dizzy Reece, featuring performances  recorded in 1958. It was his first album for the Blue Note label.

Reception

Allmusic awarded the album 4½ stars and the review by Stephen Thomas Erlewine stated, "Although the band was thrown together, there's a definite spark to this combo, which interacts as if it had been playing together for a long time. Throughout it all, Reece steals the show with his robust playing, and that's why Blues in Trinity rises above the level of standard-issue hard bop and becomes something special".

Track listing
All compositions by Dizzy Reece except as indicated

 "Blues in Trinity" - 6:45
 "I Had the Craziest Dream" (Gordon, Warren) - 3:04
 "Close-Up" - 10:38
 "Shepherd's Serenade" - 6:36
 "Color Blind" - 6:02
 "'Round About Midnight" (Monk) - 4:46
Bonus tracks on 1995 CD reissue:
"Eboo" - 4:02
 "Just a Penny" - 5:28

Personnel
Dizzy Reece - trumpet (tracks 1-5, 7, 8)
Donald Byrd - trumpet (tracks 3, 5, 7, 8)
Tubby Hayes - tenor saxophone (tracks 1, 3-8)
Terry Shannon - piano
Lloyd Thompson - bass
Art Taylor - drums

References

Blue Note Records albums
Dizzy Reece albums
1959 albums